St Clement's Chapel is a 17th-century Roman Catholic church in Żejtun, Malta.

History
This chapel was built as a thanksgiving for a vow that a certain village local did. Clemente Tabone had vowed that should his life be spared from the invading piracy headed by the Turkish army who constantly attacked Malta during the 17th century, he would build a chapel in honor of St Clement to whom he prayed. The chapel was built in 1658. Klement was also responsible for equipping the chapel with all items needed to celebrate services and for the celebration of the feast of St Clement every 23 November with vespers and mass. Klement was also responsible for lighting the oil lamp in the chapel in commemoration of his late wife Dorothy Cumbo and for the celebration of two masses every week.

Interior
The titular painting, the work of Stefano Erardi, depicts its founder Clemente Tabone, whose head and prayerful hands can be spotted in the bottom left corner. The painting depicts Pope Clement I, the Blessed Virgin and the child Jesus with several angles. The painting dates from 1662. Another notable painting, by Francesco Zahra, depicts the Pietà.

References

1658 establishments in Malta
Żejtun
National Inventory of the Cultural Property of the Maltese Islands
Limestone churches in Malta
Roman Catholic churches completed in 1658
Roman Catholic chapels in Malta
17th-century Roman Catholic church buildings in Malta